Jahnstadion is a multi-use stadium in Mönchengladbach, Germany . It is used as the stadium of Rheydter Spielverein matches.  The capacity of the stadium is 20,000 spectators.

External links
 Stadium information

Football venues in Germany
Buildings and structures in Mönchengladbach
Sports venues in North Rhine-Westphalia
Sport in Mönchengladbach